A health scare can be broadly defined as a social phenomenon whereby the public at large comes to fear some threat to health, based on suppositions which are nearly always not well-founded.

In 2009 an ABC News article listed "The Top 10 Health Scares of the Decade": "Some of these threats turned out to be almost nonexistent. Others were arguably overblown. Some caused widespread harm." They listed the following scares:

 Swine flu (H1N1)
 Bisphenol A (BPA)
 Lead paint on toys from China
 Trans fats
 Bird flu (H5N1)
 Severe acute respiratory syndrome (SARS)
 Methicillin-resistant Staphylococcus aureus (MRSA)
 Hormone replacement therapy (HRT)
 Anthrax
 Cell phones.

See also 
 List of health scares
 Health crisis
 Aspartame controversy
 Dental amalgam controversy
 Thiomersal and vaccines
 Water fluoridation controversy
 COVID-19

References 

Fear
Medical controversies